Malek Haddad (born in Constantine, Algeria on 5 July 1927; died in Algiers on 2 June 1978) was an Algerian poet and writer in the French language.

Partial bibliography 
 Le Malheur en danger (poems), La Nef de Paris, 1956; Bouchène, 1988 (with an illustration by M'hamed Issiakhem).
 La Dernière impression (novel), Julliard, 1958
 Je t’offrirai une gazelle (novel), Julliard, 1959; re-edition 10/18
 L’Élève et la leçon (novel), Julliard, 1960; re-edition 10/18
 Le Quai aux Fleurs ne répond plus (novel), Julliard 1961; re-edition 10/18
 Les Zéros tournent en rond (essay), Maspero, 1961
 Écoute et je t’appelle (poems), Maspero 1961

References 

Algerian male poets
Algerian novelists
People from Constantine, Algeria
1927 births
1978 deaths
20th-century novelists
20th-century Algerian poets
20th-century male writers
Algerian writers in French